Arlington Community Schools is the municipal school district in Arlington, Tennessee in Greater Memphis.

History 
After Memphis City Schools and Shelby County Schools were merged in March 2011 (effective beginning 2013–2014 school year), several local municipalities attempted to create their own districts. After a protracted legal battle, several municipalities won the right to create their own school districts.

Arlington Community Schools provides K-12 education for students residing within the municipal boundaries of the Town of Arlington. Through an Interlocal Agreement between Arlington Community Schools and Lakeland School System, high (9-12) school students in the neighboring municipality of Lakeland attend Arlington High School.

In December 2013 the district selected as its superintendent Tammy Mason, the former principal of Arlington High School.

Schools

Elementary schools 
 Arlington Elementary School
 Donelson Elementary School

Middle schools 
 Arlington Middle School

High schools 
 Arlington High School

References

External links 
 Arlington Community Schools
 "Schools in Transition." The Commercial Appeal.

School districts in Shelby County, Tennessee
School districts established in 2013